The first season of Idol Philippines premiered on April 21, 2019 on ABS-CBN (under the full title Search for Idol Philippines), and ran until the season finale on July 28, 2019. It was the first season to air on the network following two defunct iterations from different networks. Billy Crawford hosted the season; while the judging panel was composed of singer-actress Regine Velasquez, comedian and television presenter Vice Ganda, singer-actor James Reid, and singer-songwriter Moira Dela Torre.

Zephanie Dimaranan of Biñan, Laguna was named Idol Philippines, winning an exclusive recording contract from Star Music and ₱2,000,000. Lucas Garcia of Lipa, Batangas finished as the runner-up with Lance Busa finishing in third place.

Overview

Development
On October 17, 2018, it was announced that ABS-CBN will broadcast the third incarnation of the Idol franchise in the Philippines after it had sealed a franchise deal with Fremantle and 19 Entertainment, the co-owners of the format.

Prizes 
The winner of the season received ₱2,000,000, a paid vacation trip to Taiwan, a House & Lot from Camella Homes and an exclusive recording contract from Star Music

Judges and host

In October 2018, Regine Velasquez was revealed as the first judge after signing her exclusive contract with ABS-CBN. With her 32 years in the entertainment industry, this will be a first time for her to judge a singing competition. Following this announcement, there were rumors that Jessica Sanchez, the runner-up of the 11th season of American Idol, will be added as a judge but it has been denied by her. Speculations also circulated that David Archuleta, the runner-up of the seventh season of American Idol, was also considered to become a judge for the show, but the rumors were downplayed by him saying that he was not invited by the network's management.

In November 2018, Billy Crawford confirmed his role as the host of the local franchise which is part of his renewed contract deal with ABS-CBN.

On February 26, 2019, Philippine Entertainment Portal unofficially revealed that James Reid, Vice Ganda and Moira Dela Torre will join Velasquez as the show's judging panel. According to the website, a reliable source sent them a photo of the four judges standing behind a judges' table similar to those of the other Idol franchises. The three remaining judges' were later confirmed on the same day, after they were officially introduced on TV Patrol, ABS-CBN's primetime newscast. Among the four judges, Vice Ganda is an experienced judge—having been a judge for It's Showtime besides being a host, Pinoy Boyband Superstar, and two seasons of Pilipinas Got Talent. It was revealed in an interview that Vice Ganda was the only judge handpicked by Fremantle.

Companion online show
An online show, called Idol on the Road, airs together with the main program on Idol Philippines Facebook and YouTube accounts; it is hosted by BoybandPH and comedian Jervi Li, commonly known as KaladKaren Davila. The said show airs live from the Idol Philippines Bus.

Pre-auditions
The pre-auditions for the premiere season took place in different key cities in the Philippines. Auditionees must be 16 to 28 years old.

{| class="wikitable sortable" style="text-align:center; line-height:16px; width:auto; font-size:100%;"
|+ class="nowrap" | Shortlist of the locations for the ''Idol Philippines pre-auditions
|-
! scope="col" | Date
! scope="col" | Venue
! scope="col" | City
! scope="col" | Ref.
|-
| rowspan="4" style="text-align:left;" | November 15, 2018
| Center for Multiple Intelligence School
| Lapu-Lapu City
| 
|-
| Karesh Commercial Complex
| Bogo, Cebu
| 
|-
| Rock Republic
| Cebu City
| 
|-
| Tulay Bar
| Maasin, Southern Leyte
| 
|-
| rowspan="3" style="text-align:left;" | November 16, 2018
| Brown Academy School
| Cebu City
| 
|-
| Monterey School, Inc.
| Talisay, Cebu
| 
|-
| Pier Capitan Superdome
| Ormoc, Leyte
| 
|-
| rowspan="3" style="text-align:left;" | November 17, 2018
| Barili Gymnasium
| Cebu City
| 
|-
| Manros Plaza Building
| Cebu City
| 
|-
| Municipality of San Jose Function Room
| San Jose, Antique
| 
|-
| style="text-align:left;" | November 17 & 18, 2018
| Palo Leyte Academic Center
| Palo, Leyte
| 
|-
| style="text-align:left;" | November 23, 2018
| Bukidnon National High School
| Malaybalay, Bukidnon
| 
|-
| style="text-align:left;" | November 24, 2018
| Sanguniang Panlungsod Building
| Gingoog
| 
|-
| style="text-align:left;" | November 24 & 25, 2018
| Lipa City Youth and Cultural Center
| Lipa, Batangas
| rowspan="3" | 
|-
| style="text-align:left;" | November 25, 2018
| University of the Philippines–Baguio
| Baguio
|-
| style="text-align:left;" | November 30, 2018
| Lyceum of the Philippines University Manila
| Intramuros, Manila
|-
| style="text-align:left;" | December 1, 2018
| Surigao State College of Technology–Del Carmen
| Del Carmen, Surigao del Norte
| 
|-
| style="text-align:left;" | December 1 & 2, 2018
| University of Negros Occidental–Recoletos
| Bacolod City
| rowspan="2" | 
|-
| style="text-align:left;" | December 2, 2018
| Lyceum of the Philippines University Manila
| Intramuros, Manila
|-
| style="text-align:left;" | December 3, 2018
| CFC School of Morning Star
| Butuan
| 
|-
| rowspan="2" style="text-align:left;" | January 19 & 20, 2019
| Pacific Mall
| Mandaue City
| rowspan="2" | 
|-
| People's Gym
| Digos, Davao del Sur
|-
| style="text-align:left;" | January 26 & 27, 2019
| Starmall Alabang
| Alabang, Muntinlupa
| 
|-
|}

Aside from ground scouting and pre-auditions held all over the Philippines, the online auditions was also launched in November 20, 2018.

Competition summary
Color key

 Auditions 
The auditions were recorded at the One Canvas Events Place in Makati. In the televised auditions, contestants will perform in front of the panel of judges. Each contestant must receive three "yes" votes from the judges in order to advance and receive a golden ticket to Idol City. The first audition episode was aired on April 21, 2019, with the final audition episode being aired on June 8, 2019. 69 Idol hopefuls were able to advance and receive their respective golden ticket to Idol City.

 Theater rounds 
The theater rounds were recorded at the ABS-CBN Soundstage at San Jose del Monte, Bulacan and first aired on June 9, 2019. These are composed of three rounds – the Group, Do or Die, and Solo rounds.

Group round
In the Group round, the Idol hopefuls were grouped based on their genre and sound. As a group, they selected a song from a list that they think is the best for them, additionally they gave a name to their group. At the end of the group rounds, thirty-nine Idol hopefuls remained.

Color key:

Do or Die round
In the Do or Die round, the judges divided the remaining Idol hopefuls into six and selected a song for them to perform. At the end of the second round, twenty contestants remained. The male hopefuls performed pop hits from female artists, while the female hopefuls performed hits from OPM Rock bands.

Color key:

Solo round
The Solo round is the final round of the Theater Rounds where the remaining Idol hopefuls pick a solo song. Only the twelve hopefuls proceeded to the Live shows. The first episode aired the performances of the female Idol hopefuls; while the second episode aired the performances of the male Idol hopefuls.

Color key:

Live shows
For the first time in the Idol franchise, the judges determines half of the contestants' score while the public determines the other half via public vote. The Hopefuls with the lowest scores will be eliminated in varying amounts per week with the best possible score a contestant can receive is 100% per the format the network uses in scoring.

Color key:

Week 1: Top 12 – Songs of Ryan Cayabyab (June 29 & 30)
For the first week of the Live Shows, the Top 12 performed songs sung or composed by OPM Icon and National Artist Ryan Cayabyab with Cayabyab also serving as guest mentor.

 Week 2: Top 10 – The Champions (July 6 & 7) 
For Week 2, the Top 10 performed songs written or performed by Star in a Million winner Erik Santos and Pinoy Dream Academy winner Yeng Constantino. Santos and Constantino also mentored the Top 10.

Week 3: Top 8 – Philippines’ Most Streamed Hits (July 13 & 14)
For Week 3, the Top 8 performed the Philippines’ most streamed hits. Morissette served as guest mentor.

Week 4: Top 6 – Songs of Gary Valenciano (July 20 & 21)
For Week 4, the Top 6 performed songs by singer-songwriter Gary Valenciano. He also served as guest mentor.

Week 5: The Final Showdown (July 27 & 28)

 Part 1 - Top 5 
The Top 5 performed live at Newport Performing Arts Theater in Resorts World Manila on July 27, 2019. Two contestants were eliminated by the end of night one, leaving the Top 3 to battle it out on July 28, 2019. In addition to the competition pieces sung by the Top 5, female winners from different singing competitions performed songs sung by American Idol'' winners as special guests.

Part 2 - Top 3 
The Top 3 performed live at Newport Performing Arts Theater in Resorts World Manila on July 28, 2019. The winner was announced at the end of the show.

Elimination chart 
Color key

Reception

Critical Response 
The televised auditions for the first season was met with mixed public reception. Netizens questioned Dela Torre and Reid's credibility as judges, although Reid was praised for his frankness. The show was compared in a negative light to other singing competitions, including The Voice of The Philippines, specially following the aftermath of the rejection of reggae artist Luke Baylon, in which only one judge, Velasquez voted to advance Baylon into the next round. Amid the criticism, Velasquez defended her fellow judges in an interview with reporters during the 35th PMPC Awards for movies, stating that "the three were chosen to be at the judging table because of their individual expertise".

References

Idols (franchise)
2019 Philippine television seasons